Walter Speight (1881 – after 1904) was an English professional footballer who played as an inside forward.

References

1881 births
People from Elsecar
English footballers
Association football inside forwards
Grimsby Town F.C. players
Rotherham Town F.C. (1899) players
Worksop Town F.C. players
English Football League players
Year of death missing